Lawrence Eugene Forgy (August 4, 1939 – January 13, 2022) was an American Republican politician and gubernatorial candidate from Lexington, Kentucky.

Forgy served as the Budget Director for Governor Louie Nunn from 1967 to 1971.

Career
Forgy announced that he would seek the Republican gubernatorial nomination in 1987 but soon withdrew from the race, citing fundraising difficulties. The party then tapped State Representative John R. Harper of Bullitt County as its nominee, but Harper carried only 5 of the 120 counties against the Democrat businessman, Wallace Wilkinson.

Forgy ran for the Republican gubernatorial nomination in 1991 but lost in the primary to then U.S. Representative Larry J. Hopkins, also of Lexington. Forgy again ran for governor in 1995, but he was defeated in the general election by Democrat Paul E. Patton. In 1999, Forgy ran unsuccessfully for the Kentucky Supreme Court but lost in a special election to James E. Keller. He was reportedly considering running in the 2008 United States Senate election in Kentucky, but he did not file as a candidate for the office, held by Senate Minority Leader Mitch McConnell of Jefferson County. Forgy had been an early McConnell backer when the then county judge in Jefferson County was first elected to the Senate in 1984.

In 2004, Forgy was co-chair of Bryan Coffman's unsuccessful race for Central Kentucky's 6th congressional district. Coffman lost to Democrat Ben Chandler, grandson of former Governor and U.S. Senator Happy Chandler.

Previously, Forgy has been a practicing attorney and the president of the non-profit organization, Health Kentucky. Forgy was a former Republican national committeeman, the Kentucky chairman of Ronald W. Reagan's successful presidential election bids, vice chairman of Kentucky Council Higher Education, chairman of the Finance Committee of the University of Kentucky Board of Trustees, and  general counsel and budget director in the administration of former Governor Louie B. Nunn.

Forgy attended the University of Kentucky at Lexington, where he was a member of Delta Tau Delta social fraternity. He transferred to George Washington University in Washington, D.C. from which he received both a bachelor's and law degree. While in law school at GWU, he  became friends with former Democratic Senate Majority Leader Harry Reid of Nevada, McConnell's counterpart in the Senate.

In 2011, Forgy stated that the only reason Kentucky Governor Steven Beshear picked Jerry Abramson to be his running mate was "to attract New York and Hollywood Jewish money" for the campaign.

In 2012, Forgy was self employed as an attorney in Frankfort, Kentucky.

Health and death
Forgy suffered a heart attack in 2017. He died in Lexington on January 13, 2022, at the age of 82.

References

1939 births
2022 deaths
George Washington University Law School alumni
Kentucky lawyers
Kentucky Republicans
Politicians from Frankfort, Kentucky
Politicians from Lexington, Kentucky
People from Logan County, Kentucky
University of Kentucky alumni